The 1994 IBF World Junior Championships was an international badminton tournament held in Kuala Lumpur, Malaysia.

Medalists

Individual competition

Semifinals

Finals

References

External links
World Junior Championships at Badminton.de

worldbadminton.com

BWF World Junior Championships
World Junior Championships, 1994
Badminton tournaments in Malaysia
1994 in Malaysian sport
International sports competitions hosted by Malaysia